Wallenia calyptrata is a species of plant in the family Primulaceae. It is endemic to Jamaica.

References

calyptrata
Endemic flora of Jamaica
Taxonomy articles created by Polbot